Elizabeth Christ Trump (born Elisabeth Christ; ; October 10, 1880 – June 6, 1966) was a German-American businesswoman and the paternal grandmother of Donald Trump, the 45th president of the United States. She married Frederick Trump in 1902. They had three children, Fred, John, and Elizabeth (later Mrs. Walters). Her husband died in 1918, requiring the 37-year-old widow to manage their properties. She co-founded the real estate development company E. Trump & Son with her son Fred, the father of Donald Trump.

Early life
Elizabeth Trump was born as Elisabeth Christ in Kallstadt, Kingdom of Bavaria, the daughter of Philipp Christ by his wife Anna Maria Christ (née Anthon). While the family owned a little vineyard, the income from that was not adequate to meet their needs, and Philipp Christ worked as a tinker repairing and polishing old utensils and selling pots and pans. He ran his trade from his house on Freinsheimer Straße in Kallstadt, which was just across the street from the home of the Trump family, where Katharina Trump, an elderly widow, lived with her six children.

Marriage and family

Katharina Trump's son, Frederick Trump, had immigrated to America in 1885 at the age of 16 and made his fortune with restaurants and brothels in the Klondike Gold Rush. When he returned to Germany in 1901, he wooed Elisabeth over the objections of his mother, who felt that her prosperous son could and should find a bride from a wealthier and more refined family than that of Elisabeth.

Nonetheless, Frederick proposed to Elisabeth, who accepted, and they were married on 26 August 1902. He was 33 years of age at the time and she was 21. Friedrich and Elisabeth moved to New York and they set up house in an apartment in the predominantly German quarter of Morrisania in the Bronx. Elizabeth (as her name was spelled in the United States) kept house, while Frederick worked as a restaurant and hotel manager. Their first child, Elizabeth, was born on April 30, 1904.

Despite living in a German neighborhood, Elizabeth was homesick. The family returned to Kallstadt in 1904, selling their assets in America. As the Bavarian authorities suspected he had left Germany to avoid war service in the Imperial Army, Frederick could not remain in Germany, so the family returned to the United States in 1905. 

Their second child, Fred, was born, and they set up house on 177th Street in the Bronx. After Elizabeth gave birth to her third child, John, the family moved to Queens, where Frederick began to develop real estate. In 1918, he died of influenza during the 1918 flu pandemic, leaving an estate valued at $31,359 (or approximately ).

Trump was considered the matriarch of the Trump family. She remained close to her son Fred for her entire life.

E. Trump & Son

Following the death of her husband, Elizabeth Trump continued the real estate business he had begun. She had contractors build houses on the empty lots Frederick had owned, sold the houses, and earned income off the mortgages she provided to buyers. Her vision was to have her three children continue the family business. Initially, she operated under the ungendered name "E. Trump." In 1924, she switched to "E. Trump & Son" for  advertising purposes, then "Sons," then back to the singular when it became clear that only her first son, Fred, would join. In later interviews, Fred tended to put himself center stage, saying that he had always dreamt of being a builder; that he completed his first house in 1924, just one year out of high school; and that his mother only got involved because she was old enough to "sign checks." But there are indications that Fred actually started more slowly and Elizabeth contributed more, including capital. When the business was formally incorporated, in 1927, Fred was old enough to sign checks, but "E. Trump & Son" remained the name. "It was no misnomer," wrote biographer Wayne Barrett, "she was intimately involved in the business."

Elizabeth Trump stayed involved in the family business throughout her life. In her 70s, she allegedly collected coins from the laundromats in Trump buildings. Trump family biographer Gwenda Blair heard this from Elizabeth's grandchildren. However, this may only be a family parable, as it has been attached to others. According to Harry Hurt, Mary Trump, the wife of Elizabeth's son Fred, "drove back and forth between her husband's apartment projects in a Rolls-Royce, collecting coins from the washing machines in the laundry rooms." During his 2016 presidential campaign, Elizabeth's grandson Donald Trump told a crowd in Staten Island that he had spent "probably five" boyhood summers there collecting coins from his father's laundry machines.

References

External links
 

1880 births
1966 deaths
American real estate businesspeople
American women business executives
American business executives
Bavarian emigrants to the United States
Businesspeople from New York City
People from Bad Dürkheim (district)
Elizabeth